These are the official results of the Men's 110 metres Hurdles event at the 1995 IAAF World Championships in Gothenburg, Sweden. There were a total number of 48 participating athletes, with two semi-finals, four quarter-finals and six qualifying heats and the final held on Saturday August 12, 1995.

Medalists

Final

Semi-finals
Held on Saturday 1995-08-12

Quarterfinals
Held on Friday 1995-08-11

Qualifying heats
Held on Friday 1995-08-11

See also
 1994 Men's European Championships 110m Hurdles (Helsinki)
 1996 Men's Olympic 110m Hurdles (Atlanta)
 1998 Men's European Championships 110m Hurdles (Budapest)

References
 Results

H
Sprint hurdles at the World Athletics Championships